A containerized housing unit, usually abbreviated as CHU (and sometimes called containerized living unit or CLU) is an ISO shipping container pre-fabricated into a living quarters. Such containers can be transported by container ships, railroad cars, planes, and trucks that are capable of transporting intermodal freight transport cargo.

Container housing units are related to the site and land occupied during a certain amount of time by the need of water supply and excavation, electricity, telecommunications, etc. Plug-in city is a concept that is developing as more units capable of moving by intermodal means are brought up to the market. Local site is thus of most importance on correct container housing units use.  An example of CLU housing is at the Operation Enduring Freedom - Horn of Africa base (Camp Lemonnier) in Djibouti.

Modular shipping containers are typically referred to as isotainers. In some military applications, the slang terms "Combat Housing Unit" or "cans" has also gained acceptance.

First developed by Malcom McLean to transport cargo, freight containers withstand much abuse. Freight container housing is becoming more and more popular. Shipping container architecture is a form of architecture using steel intermodal containers (shipping containers) as structural elements.

Reefer container housing units

Reefer containers or refrigerated containers are containers built to haul refrigerated or frozen products.  These containers can be repurposed for container housing or prefabricated for housing purposes.  The advantage is the insulation in the walls, ceiling, and floor compared to corrugated metal in standard shipping containers that can get very hot or cold from the weather outside. Prefabricated reefer containers with the wiring ran through the walls and the plumbing ran through the ceiling and floor before the insulation, interior walls, and floors are installed would be more practical than trying to do that with a repurposed used reefer container.

See also
 Shipping container architecture
 Affordable housing
 Manufactured housing
 Prefabricated building
 Prefabricated home

References

External links
 container housing products
 movable container club

Freight rolling stock
Packaging
Intermodal containers